An annular solar eclipse occurred on December 3, 1899, during late spring. A solar eclipse occurs when the Moon passes between Earth and the Sun, thereby totally or partly obscuring the image of the Sun for a viewer on Earth. An annular solar eclipse occurs when the Moon's apparent diameter is smaller than the Sun's, blocking most of the Sun's light and causing the Sun to look like an annulus (ring). An annular eclipse appears as a partial eclipse over a region of the Earth thousands of kilometres wide.

It was the only annular eclipse which took place that year.  It was part of  solar saros 121.

Description
The eclipse took place in much of the southeast part of the Indian Ocean and included some of the islands and all of Antarctica (many areas had a 24-hour daylight at the time) except for the South Orkney Islands, it also included most of the south of Western Australia, a part of the southwesternmost state of Victoria and much of Tasmania except for the northeasternmost part, most of New Zealand's South Island, particularly the southern part and a part of the southern portion of the Pacific Ocean. The rim of the eclipse included the area hundreds of miles (or kilometers) from Cocos Islands and the southernmost of South America, it also included the southernmost portion of the Atlantic Ocean.

The umbral portion crossed the middle of Antarctica which was close to the South Pole and the south part of the middle of the continent's peninsula, it lasted over a minute.

The eclipse began at sunrise thousands of miles (or kilometers) offshore from Africa and west of Australia and ended at sunset at Patagonia and thousands of kilometers offshore from Chile and Peru. The greatest eclipse was in the Antarctic Peninsula north of the South Pole at 86.6 S and 121.5 E at 0:57 UTC (8:57 AM local time).

It was around 65% obscured in Antarctica where the Indian and the Pacific Oceans separates.

As the moon moved towards the left on Earth in Australia and New Zealand, at the other side of Northern Antarctica that includes the 70th meridian, it was seen as it was moved towards the bottom right, in areas within the Prime Meridian, it moved right, at the peninsula, it then moved top right as the axis spun at around the 68th parallel south.

See also 
 List of solar eclipses in the 19th century

References

External links 
 Google interactive maps
 Solar eclipse data

1899 12 3
Solar eclipse of 12 03
1899 in New Zealand
1899 12 03
December 1899 events